This list of books and articles about rats is an English-only non-fiction bibliography using APA style citations.

Books

 Barkley, H.C. (2019). Studies in the Art of Rat-catching. Reprint.  Wentworth Press. 
 Barnett, A.S. (2002). The Story of Rats: Their Impact on Us, and Our Impact on Them. Allen & Unwin. .
 Hendrickson, R. (1983). More Cunning than Man: A Complete History of the Rat and its Role in Civilization, Kensington Books. .
 Hodgson, B. (1997). The Rat: A Perverse Miscellany. Ten Speed Press. 
 Langton, J. (2007). Rat: How the World's Most Notorious Rodent Clawed Its Way to the Top. St Martins Press. 
 Lantz, D. E. (2019). The Brown Rat In The United States. Wentworth Press; Reprint. 
 Matthews, I. (1898). Full Revelations of a Professional Rat-Catcher, after 25 Years’ Experience. 1st ed. Manchester: Friendly Societies Printing Co. .
 Plummer, D. (1979). Tales of a Rat-hunting Man. Robin Clark Ltd. 
 Rodwell, J. (1850). The rat! And its cruel cost to the nation, by uncle James. Ritnsll and Weir. Pulteney Street, London, England. Reprint. 
 Rodwell, J. (1858). The Rat: Its History & Destructive Character. Reprint. 
 Sullivan, R. (2004). Rats: A Year with New York's Most Unwanted Inhabitants. Granta Books, London. 
 Sullivan, R. (2005). Rats: Observations on the History and Habitat of the City's Most Unwanted Inhabitants. Bloomsbury USA. .
 Twigg, G. (1976). The Brown Rat. David & Charles; First Edition. 
 Zinsser, H. (1935). Rats, Lice and History. Blue Ribbon Books, Inc.

Articles
 
 Musser, G. G., and M. D. Carleton. (1993). "Family Muridae" in D. E. Wilson and D. M. Reeder (eds). Mammal Species of the World: a Taxonomic and Geographic Reference, Washington, D.C.:[[Smithsonian Institution Press, pp. 501–755.

Books
Rats,books